SN 2020fqv was a type II supernova which occurred in March 2020 in the spiral galaxy NGC 4568, approximately 60 million light years from Earth. The explosion was detected by both the Zwicky Transient Facility and the Transiting Exoplanet Survey Satellite. Observations were obtained by the Hubble Space Telescope both years before and just 26 hours after it exploded, as well as many other instruments, providing the first holistic view of such an event.

References 

Supernova remnants
Supernovae
Astronomical objects discovered in 2020
Virgo (constellation)